The Danish film industry produced over fifty feature films in 2014. This article fully lists all non-pornographic films, including short films, that had a release date in that year and which were at least partly made by the Denmark. It does not include films first released in previous years that had release dates in 2014. It does, however, include films produced by Greenland and the Faroe Islands (self-governing Danish territories), which are also included in List of Greenlandic films of 2014 and List of Faroese films of 2014 respectively.  Also included is an overview of the major events in Danish film, including film festivals and awards ceremonies, as well as lists of those films that have been particularly well received, both critically and financially.

Major Releases

Minor releases

See also

 2014 in film
 2014 in Denmark
 Cinema of Denmark
 List of Danish submissions for the Academy Award for Best Foreign Language Film
 List of Faroese films of 2014
 List of Greenlandic films of 2014

References

External links

Danish
Films
Danish film-related lists
2014